1Sports is an Indian sports channel owned by Lex Sportel Vision Pvt. Ltd.(Times Network), launched after Discovery India took control of their DSport channel. 1Sports broadcasts live sporting action from around the world, including high-profile content as I-League.

History 
On 6 February 2017 Discovery Communications (DC) launched the DSport channel to broadcast different kind of sporting actions in Indian subcontinent. During the launch former MD of ESPN Star and former CEO of Dish TV RC Venkateish had joined the channel to work as content provider (acquisition) for the channel. Since then Venkateish (owner of Lex Sportel) acquired sporting rights of multiple events which were broadcast on DSport, until November 2019. In January 2020 Discovery applied a name change of their sports channel to Eurosport, which was challenged by Lex Sportel as the one who made the uplinking license deal of the channel. Delhi High Court went in favor of Discovery and as a result Lex Sportel went out of the deal. Then Lex Sportel started showing ads about the launch of their new channel and a scroll text on DSport channel that contents of the channel belongs to Lex Sportel's server based in Hong Kong, until 24 January when Discovery took full control of the channel. Though this was scheduled to take effect on 14 February, Discovery took control of the channel three weeks before the original date, but the court dismissed the matter. Finally, on 28 January Lex Sportel launched their own channel 1Sports.

Events 
Lex Sportel has acquired some premium sports events from around the world and provides over 4,000 hours of live content every year. They have broadcasting license of Afghanistan Premier League and Everest Premier League. 1Sports airs Coppa Italia, Coupe de France, A-League Men and UAE Pro League, among others. The channel also broadcasts Pro-Wrestling (Ring of Honor, WOS Wrestling and WIN: Dangal Ke Soorma), MMA (Bellator and Cage Warriors), Golf (The Open, The Masters, European Tour, LPGA and Ryder Cup), Tennis (Laver Cup) and Motor Sports (Dakar Rally and Monster Jam).

Cricket 
 Afghanistan Premier League
 Everest Premier League
 Zambia T10 league
 British Columbia T20 league
 Asian Challenger Trophy

Football 
 Coppa Italia
 Coupe de France
 UAE Pro League

Golf 
 Australian Open
 The Open Championship
 Masters Tournament
 European Tour
 LPGA
 Ryder Cup
 Hero Indian Open 
 Hero Women's Indian Open

Motor Sport  
 Dakar Rally 
 Monster Jam

Mixed Martial Arts 
 Bellator MMA
 Cage Warriors

Tennis 
 Laver Cup

References

External links

Sports television networks in India
Television channels and stations established in 2020
English-language television stations in India
2020 establishments in Haryana